Rouphinianai, also known as Drys, was a coastal town of ancient Bithynia located on the road from Libyssa to Chalcedon on the north coast of the Propontis. Its church was reportedly saved by Nicaean emperor John III Vatatzes.

Its site is located near Caddebostan in Asiatic Turkey.

References

Populated places in Bithynia
Former populated places in Turkey
History of Istanbul Province